Widnes is an industrial town in the Borough of Halton, Cheshire, England, on the north bank of the River Mersey where it narrows at Runcorn Gap.  The town contains 24 buildings that are recorded in the National Heritage List for England as designated listed buildings.  Of these, 5 are classified at Grade II*, and the rest are at Grade II; Widnes has no Grade I listed buildings.  In the United Kingdom, the term "listed building" refers to a building or other structure officially designated as being of special architectural, historical, or cultural significance. Listed buildings are categorised in three grades: Grade I consists of buildings of outstanding architectural or historical interest; Grade II* includes particularly significant buildings of more than local interest; Grade II consists of buildings of special architectural or historical interest. Buildings in England are listed by the Secretary of State for Culture, Media and Sport on recommendations provided by English Heritage, which also determines the grading.

Before 1847, the area now occupied by the town of Widnes consisted of the hamlets of Farnworth, Cronton, Appleton, and Upton; a few scattered houses; and areas of mostly marshy farmland.  In 1833 a canal and a railway reached the area;  the Sankey Canal was extended to a point on the River Mersey to the east of Runcorn Gap and the St Helens and Runcorn Gap Railway established a terminus adjacent to the canal.  Widnes Dock, the world's first railway dock, was established at the new terminal, and in 1847 John Hutchinson established the first chemical factory nearby.  During the second half of the 19th century, more chemical factories were built and the town grew, absorbing the previously separated hamlets.  The town became overcrowded and highly polluted with smoke, chemical fumes, and waste.

The town's listed buildings reflect its history.  The oldest, St Luke's Church in the former village of Farnworth, dates from the 12th century.  Also built before 1847 are three houses, a bridewell adjacent to St Luke's Church, and the lock at the terminus of the Sankey Canal.  The buildings from after 1847—four churches and the cemetery chapels, one public building (the town hall), two railway stations, two bridges crossing the River Mersey, and the former power house of the now-demolished transporter bridge—largely reflect the growing population of the town and its increasing transport links.  The Tower Building, formerly an office and now a museum, and a sewer vent, relate to the chemical industry.  The latest structures to be listed are a war memorial in Victoria Park and the former Widnes Corporation bus depot.  Other than the bridges and the lock, the building materials used are brick, local red sandstone, and terracotta.


Key

References

Citations

Sources

 
 
Listed buildings in the Borough of Halton
Listed buildings
Lists of listed buildings in Cheshire